The following lists events that happened during 1861 in Australia.

Incumbents

Governors
Governors of the Australian colonies:
Governor of New South Wales – Sir William Denison, then John Young, 1st Baron Lisgar
Governor of Queensland – Sir George Bowen
Governor of South Australia – Sir Richard G. MacDonnell
Governor of Tasmania – Sir Henry Young
Governor of Victoria – Sir Henry Barkly
Governor of Western Australia – Sir Arthur Kennedy.

Premiers
Premiers of the Australian colonies:
Premier of New South Wales – John Robertson, then Charles Cowper
Premier of Queensland – Robert Herbert
Premier of South Australia – Thomas Reynolds, then George Waterhouse
Premier of Tasmania – William Weston, then Thomas Chapman
Premier of Victoria – Richard Heales, then John O'Shanassy

Events
 13 May – The Great Comet of 1861 is discovered by John Tebbutt of Windsor, New South Wales.
 30 June – Lambing Flat riots of Lambing Flat (Young), New South Wales
 6 July – Robert Palin is hanged in Western Australia following the use of Ordinance 17 Victoria Number 7 to secure the capital punishment of a convict for a crime not normally punishable by death.
 8 July – The Geelong College is established by Reverend Alexander James Campbell in Newtown, Victoria.
 October – Robertson land acts passed by Parliament of New South Wales.

Arts and literature
 24 May – National Gallery of Victoria founded

Sport
 7 November – The first Melbourne Cup is held. It is won by Archer. (List of Melbourne Cup winners).

Births

 12 January – Jack Moses, bush poet (d. 1945)
 22 January – Sir George Fuller, 22nd Premier of New South Wales (d. 1940)
 6 February – Sir Alexander Matheson, 3rd Baronet, Western Australian politician (born in the United Kingdom) (d. 1929)
 21 February – George Elmslie, 25th Premier of Victoria (d. 1918)
 10 March – Sir John Longstaff, painter and war artist (d. 1941)
 19 May – Dame Nellie Melba, opera singer (d. 1931)
 11 June – Sir Alexander Peacock, 20th Premier of Victoria (d. 1933)
 12 June – James Gardiner, Western Australian politician (born in New Zealand) (d. 1928)
 13 June – Kate Dwyer, educator, suffragist and labour activist (d. 1949)
 22 June – John Lemmone, flautist, composer and manager (d. 1949)
 2 August – Edith Cowan, Western Australian politician and social reformer (d. 1932)
 27 August – James Ronald, Victorian politician (born in the United Kingdom) (d. 1941)
 14 September – Margaret Francis Ellen Baskerville, sculptor, water colourist, and educator (d. 1930)
 18 September – Dame Eadith Walker, heiress and philanthropist (d. 1937)
 6 October – Thomas Brown, New South Wales politician (d. 1934)
 2 December – James White, sculptor (born in the United Kingdom) (d. 1918)
 Unknown – Jim Page, Queensland politician (born in the United Kingdom) (d. 1921)

Deaths

 15 March – James Clow, Presbyterian minister and settler (born in the United Kingdom) (b. 1790)
 28 June
 Robert O'Hara Burke, explorer (born in Ireland) (b. 1821)
 William John Wills, explorer (born in the United Kingdom) (b. 1834)
 21 October – Hannibal Hawkins Macarthur, New South Wales politician and businessman (born and died in the United Kingdom) (b. 1788)

References

 
Australia
Years of the 19th century in Australia